Puppet Master is an American horror film series which focuses on a group of anthropomorphic puppets animated by an Egyptian spell, each equipped with its own unique and dangerous device and are represented as heroes, antiheroes and antagonists. The franchise was created by Charles Band and Kenneth J.Hall.

Produced by Full Moon Features, the series was established in 1989 with the eponymous first installment, which has since been followed by ten sequels, a crossover with the characters of Demonic Toys, a 2018 reboot entitled The Littlest Reich, a spin-off film about the puppet Blade, a spin-off film about Retro Puppet Master's Doktor Death, two comic book mini-series, an ongoing comic book series, a free-to-play multiplayer video game by October Games, as well as numerous other collector's items.

Development
After the collapse of his film studio Empire Pictures, Charles Band relocated to the United States and opened Full Moon Productions. Band's goal with Full Moon was to create low-budget horror, science fiction and fantasy films that mirrored the quality of films with more generous budgets. After partnering with Paramount Pictures and Pioneer Home Entertainment, Full Moon began production on its first feature film, Puppet Master, which had a premise similar to an earlier Empire film produced by Band, Dolls. Originally intended for theatrical release in summer 1989, Puppet Master was ultimately pushed to a direct-to-video release on October 12, 1989, as Band felt he was likely to make more money this way than he would in the theatrical market.

Puppet Master proved to be a success, and the film's cult status has led to the production of nine sequels, as well as a crossover with another Full Moon series, Demonic Toys. A documentary featurette titled No Strings Attached was included on VHS and Laserdisc pressings.

1990 saw the release of a sequel, Puppet Master II, and later in 1991, Puppet Master III: Toulon's Revenge, the latter a series prequel. Toulon's Revenge was the first installment to feature Guy Rolfe in the role of puppeteer Andre Toulon (in the prior films Toulon was portrayed by William Hickey and Steve Welles, respectively). Rolfe reprised the role of Toulon for three additional films. After his death in 2003, he posthumously appeared in The Legacy through extensive use of archival footage. In 1993 Full Moon began shooting another two sequels simultaneously, Puppet Master 4 and Puppet Master 5: The Final Chapter. The latter, as the title indicates, was intended to be the final installment of the series.

After the release of The Final Chapter in September 1994, Full Moon opted to retire Puppet Master and announced that a spin-off trilogy titled Puppet Wars would begin production in 1995. The spin-off trilogy was cancelled, leaving the series to continue its legacy through merchandising and a growing cult following.

Due to demand from video retailers and fans for a new installment, four years after retirement, the franchise was revived by the production of a sixth entry, Curse of the Puppet Master, in 1998. This was the first installment not to have David W. Allen involved with stop-motion special effects. By this time, Paramount had ended its deal with Full Moon, so to conserve costs, the film used a combination of rod and string puppets, as well as archival footage. In September 1999, Full Moon Features released Totem, featuring characters similar to the Totems of the fourth film.

Also in 1999, a second prequel (taking place at an even earlier time than Toulon's Revenge) was released, titled Retro Puppet Master. The original idea for the seventh installment was for it to take place following Toulon's Revenge, with Toulon and his puppets escaping Germany by train, after which they are confronted by Nazis and demons. This idea was abandoned because the distributor, the Kushner Locke Company, thought it would offend the German audience, although it later formed the basis for the ninth installment of the series, Puppet Master: Axis of Evil. Retro Puppet Master was an anomaly to the series, in that the main theme composed by Richard Band was completely absent, and with its PG-13 rating, this was the first installment not to be rated R by the Motion Picture Association of America. The films following this would all fall under not rated.

An eighth entry, entitled The Legacy, was released in 2003, however only a fraction contains original footage; the remainder is archival footage used to summarize the series thus far. The same year, a crossover film featuring the animated playthings of Full Moon's Puppet Master and Demonic Toys series aired on Sci-Fi Channel, although it was said it did not take place in the same continuity as either of those franchises.

In 2005, Band alluded to a possible television series titled Puppet Wars (see left for promotional artwork) and expressed interest in seeing a video game adaptation of the franchise developed. In June 2008, Band announced that a ninth installment of the series is planned, tentatively subtitled Axis of Evil. In March 2009, it was reported that Band is also interested in remaking 1989's Puppet Master in 3-D. Similarly, the original film was reissued by Razor Digital in 2007 in DualDisc format, featuring both standard and stereoscopic versions.

In June 2009, the Full Moon website posted updates about the latest installment, revealing the roster of puppets to be included, as well as principal cast members Levi Fiehler and Jerry Hoffman. Puppet Master: Axis of Evil was released on DVD, Blu-ray and streaming in 2010.

In 2012, Full Moon released the tenth installment, entitled Puppet Master X: Axis Rising, which continued the story and events from the previous film.

In 2017, Full Moon announced that Puppet Master: Axis Termination would debut exclusively on Full Moon Streaming in three parts starting in September 2017.

In 2018, a reboot was produced under the title Puppet Master: The Littlest Reich.

In 2020, a spin-off film revolving around the puppet Blade was released under the title Blade: The Iron Cross.

In 2022, a second spin-off film about Doktor Death (from Retro) was released as Puppet Master: Doktor Death.

In March 2023, a third spin-off centered around Leech Woman was announced with Puppet Master: Furnace Leech Woman.

Films

Storyline chronology
As the series expanded, it created many continuity errors. One major discrepancy is the year of Toulon's demise; the original film states that Toulon committed suicide in 1939 at the Bodega Bay Inn in Bodega Bay, California, while he is alive in 1941 (Toulon's Revenge). There was an attempt to fix the errors with the release of The Legacy in 2003. However, Axis of Evil, released in 2010, continues to reuse the footage of Toulon committing suicide at the Bodega Bay Inn (as illustrated in the first) without altering the year of the setting.

Below is a table of all films in chronological order. The series also bridges the narrative gap between two or more of the films by using a prologue and epilogue from Retro, as well as a flashback scene from II.

Retro Puppet Master
In 1902, an unconventionally immortal Egyptian named Afzel steals the secret of life from the god Sutekh. Sutekh sends several followers after Afzel, but none are successful in killing him and returning the spell. In Paris, Afzel is severely wounded and is sheltered by André Toulon. Afzel teaches Toulon Sutekh's spell, telling him when gods like Sutekh rise up one day, the secret of life will be the only thing to protect humanity. Toulon uses the secret to animate one of his puppets, Pinhead. Comfortable that the spell has been passed on, Afzel commits suicide in front of Sutekh's henchmen, making them believe Afzel has taken the magic to his grave. However, when Toulon uses the spell to animate a handful of other puppets, Cyclops, Drill Sergeant, Six Shooter, Blade and Doctor Death, Sutekh's henchmen return to Paris to slay the Puppet Master. While the puppets are successful in besting Sutekh's forces, two of them are resurrected to pursue Toulon. After the demons kidnap Toulon's love, Elsa, he confronts them on a train and battle ensues. Toulon and his puppets are successful in defeating their pursuers and rescuing Elsa.

A flashback from Puppet Master II (1990) takes place ten years later; Toulon and Elsa – now married - move their puppetry to Cairo and display a new puppet named “Mephisto”. In the audience is a magician who plans to recruit Toulon by secretly setting his theater ablaze and then acting as savior to the puppeteer and his wife. The magician reveals his own animated puppet (a chained Egyptian goblin puppet named “Homunculus”) brought to life using an elixir formula. (This event is first revealed in a flashback from Puppet Master II and later reinstated with archived footage in "Puppet Master: The Legacy." The integration of both "origins" for Toulon's powers over his puppets suggests that he, for reasons unaddressed, could no longer animate them with the Egyptian spell. Toulon would utilize this new, more sinister, method after he and Elsa fell under the hypnotic influence of this mysterious sorcerer).

Puppet Master III: Toulon's Revenge
To adjust the timeline, one could argue that this film takes place in 1941, because the Eastern Front conducted operation in summer of 1941. That would push Toulon's death back to 1945.

In a small theater in Berlin during World War II, a middle-aged André and Elsa Toulon set up a politically satirical puppet show for children. It stars a six-armed American Old West puppet named Six Shooter, who attacks an inanimate reconstruction puppet of Adolf Hitler. There, they are soon discovered by a scientist named Dr. Hess, who is forced by the Nazis, especially his Gestapo liaison Major Kraus, to create a drug capable of animating corpses to use as living shields on the battlefield. The following day, Kraus, Hess, and squad of Nazi soldiers kill Elsa when she refuses to hand over the puppets and place André under arrest for the treason of insulting of the Führer. Toulon soon escapes with the assistance of Pinhead and Tunnler.

Toulon returns to his theater and finds that the stage has been burnt by the Nazis. Luckily, he finds Six Shooter and Jester within the rubble. He sets up camp in a partially destroyed hospital. There he decides to seek revenge and places his wife's life essence into a doll that resembles her (Leech Woman). With the use of his puppets, Toulon hunts down the soldiers that are responsible for his wife's death and befriends two refugees: a boy named Peter Hertz and his father. After Six Shooter loses an arm while assassinating General Müller, the supervisor of the Nazi reanimation project, Peter volunteers to go to Toulon's old atelier to look for a replacement arm. He is soon caught by Dr. Hess, who asks the boy to take him to Toulon. Dr. Hess and Toulon become friends, but their friendship is soon cut short when Kraus and his soldiers storm the ruins. It is revealed that Peter's father betrayed Toulon in exchange for a pardon for his family. Dr. Hess and Mr. Hertz are killed, while Toulon and Peter escape with the help of the puppets.

That night, Major Kraus returns to his office, only to fall prey to an ambush by Toulon and his puppets, now joined by Blade, infused with Hess' essence. Toulon takes terrible revenge on Kraus by impaling him on sharp hooks and hanging him from the ceiling. Toulon plants a halberd from Kraus' office point up, then lights the support rope on fire. The rope eventually snaps and Kraus falls fatally onto the halberd. The film ends with Toulon, posing as Kraus, and Peter leaving the country for Geneva on the express train.

The prologue and epilogue from Retro follow immediately after this film chronologically. After reuniting Peter Hertz with relatives, Toulon continues his travels to the Swiss border, taking shelter at an inn, where he tells his puppets the story of Afzel and of his original puppets. That film ends with Toulon promising to his puppets that he will one day tell them the outcome of the original puppets.

Puppet Master: Axis of Evil
Continuing to hide from the Nazis in the United States, Toulon takes shelter at the Bodega Bay Inn in Bodega Bay, California. The Gestapo, however, have traced his location and two soldiers are sent to the hotel to capture him. Toulon hides his chest containing his puppets inside a wall panel and commits suicide before the spies can infiltrate his room. Bodega Bay employee Danny Coogan discovers Toulon's body, along with his trunk of puppets, and begins taking care of them and, eventually, their secret. Coogan becomes jealous when his girlfriend, who also knows the puppets are alive, flirts with a man Coogan recognizes as one of the Gestapo. Coogan discovers the Gestapo are involved in a plan to bomb the United States, and with the puppets' help, Coogan resolves to stop them. He creates a new puppet "Ninja" to aid the others in battle.

Puppet Master X: Axis Rising
After foiling a plot to blow up an American arms plant, Danny Coogan and his girlfriend, Beth, quickly find that their troubles have just begun. One of Toulon's mysterious puppets has been taken by the Nazis, and under the wicked, watchful eye of the occultist Commandant Moebius, the puppets' life-giving serum is synthesized to create a master race of unstoppable soldiers. Moebius plots to assassinate the highly decorated General Porter to deliver a crippling blow to the American war effort, but his experiments are not ready. A Nazi Scientist uses the serum to create his own superior race of Nazi Puppets in the form of Blitzkrieg, Wehrmacht, Bombshell and Kamikaze! Danny and Beth, teamed with craggy Sergeant Stone and Toulon's puppets, are no match for Moebius and his war machine. It is up to Blade, Pinhead, Leech Woman and Jester to revive their own secret weapon to stop the Axis Rising.

Puppet Master: Axis Termination
After the events of Axis Rising, Danny and Beth arrange to meet Captain Brooks so that they can hand over the puppets to be used in the American war effort, but they are both shot and killed by a Nazi Spy that is posing as Brooks.

After killing the spy he had been assigned to take a puppet trunk from the bodies and take it back to Kip, there he discovered that the American army had been tipped off about the Nazis using the occult to give life to their own puppets and had successfully killed another American general and six citizens and he needed Brooks to work with a team of psychics led by Dr. Ivan Ivanov to find out how the puppets work so that they can use the magic inside of them to help the American war effort. Brooks was not happy with this assignment as he didn't like being told what to do by a Russian 'dwarf' and also didn't believe in living puppets or psychic phenomena. While he stayed with them he quickly began to gain their respect and believe in their powers, after Ivan's daughter had read his thoughts and brought back his horrific war incident.

A few days after he had settled in with the psychic group, there was an explosion in a power station that had knocked out all of the power to the city, so they, along with Blade, Tunneler and Leech Woman went to the location to investigate. While they were there they were ambushed by Sturmbahnfurher Krabke, who was a psychic Nazi with stronger powers than any of them and he had used magic to stun them all to the ground. After this they were rescued by Leech Woman who had spat a leech onto his eye which allowed them to all escape and regroup. When they had returned home they had discovered that Ivan's daughter had been kidnapped and the psychics used their powers to trace her location, which was an old mansion that a large group of Nazi spies were hiding. Brooks, with the help of the puppets had raided the building and shot and killed as many of the Nazis as possible, before coming face to face with Krabke again, who had used his powers to paralyze him to the ground, but he was saved when Pinhead grabbed Krabke by the throat and choked the life out of him. After killing most of the Nazis, they had returned home where they placed the puppets into the trunk to rest.

Blade: The Iron Cross
In 1944–45, Ivan has moved to Russia to study brain research and he leaves the puppets with Elisa. During this time Elisa begins to have vivid nightmares about Elsa's death and Major Kraus. She soon realizes this is psychic memories that she is picking up from Blade and she also has vivid visions of Blade in distress, explosions and an evil doctor and she knows these are events which will transpire. Blade is the only one of the puppets that can make slight movements, despite having virtually no elixir left in his body and he spends his time either hiding behind the trunk like a guardian or observing Elisa as she bathes. Elisa notices Blade is different from the other puppets and he is able to feed off of her psychic energy and she also sees that his knife is dull and she sharpens it up but cuts herself by mistake, which causes her to bleed and this creates a blood bond between the two and she also uses her psychic powers to look inside of Blade and possibly discover who he was in his human life. Meanwhile, Dr. Hauser, a Nazi doctor that was a former colleague of Hess, is continuing the Deathcorp Project at a hideout in California and is performing experiments on innocent victims. His project is funded by an American district attorney, James D. Madison, who has betrayed America and had sided with the Nazis. Madison also has top secret files from the government which have scans of the Scroll of Osiris, as well as photos and information about Toulon's puppets.

Blade manages to have enough energy to sneak out into the night to participate in his own solo Nazi hunting and he hides out at a factory under a sheet and Officer Bruce, a corrupt American police officer is also there and stealing supplies for the Nazis. Bruce hears Blade's footsteps and discovers him under the sheet and calls him Pinocchio before hitting him across the room with his baton. Bruce picks up Blade to hit him again but Blade uses his eye spikes to impale Bruce's hand, which causes him to smack Blade against a wall, which only causes the spikes to go in further. Blade manages to break free and musters enough strength to impales Bruce's ankle with his hook and drag him across the room and then finishes him off by sawing his head off violently with his knife. During this time Elisa is at home dreaming of these events as they play out and she feels a jolt of power every time Blade's knife is used, which reveals a psychic link between the two. Later on Gloria Vasquez, a Spanish nationalist spy and her henchman break into Elisa's apartment and tare the place apart looking for Blade and the scroll of Osiris. They manage to find the scroll hidden behind a painting and then she uses a special chemical to put press photographer Barney Barnes to sleep and take him back to be experimented on by Hauser. During this time Blade was observing the events from a closet, before moving to the window where he had hung on by the tip of his hook, he then jumped down many stories and landed on the ground without any sign of injury and followed Gloria to Hauser's secret hideout. Meanwhile, Madison used a smoke bomb at the Daily Herald to knock Elisa and detective Joe Gray unconscious and also take them back to the hideout and Blade was already there and hiding behind a shelf. Joe is chained up on on the ceiling and his leg is broken with a wrench and Elisa is strapped to a torture device and repeatedly electrocuted and asked to hand over the translation of the scroll of Osiris, as Hauser was unable to do it himself as he didn't understand Russian, Greek and Egyptian symbols, he also reveals that he plans to uses a giant Death Ray on the roof to shoot out a signal which will kill half the population of California and then revive them as murderous zombies that will follow orders from the Nazi regime.

Elisa refuses and is continued to be electrocuted with the torture device but she uses her psychic bio-energy to shut the machine down. After this Blade cuts Joe down from his chain and systematically goes on a killing spree across the hideout and he begins by putting his hook into the mouth of one of the henchman and cutting him in the back of the head and slitting his throat. He then is fired at by Lang's gun but each bullet misses and Blade finishes him off with a few stabs to the throat. Hauser then uses his machine to transform Barney into a zombie slave to go after Blade, but he attacks Gloria instead, biting her and leaving her for dead and then Blade stabs her in the throat before putting Barney out his misery by cutting his leg and then sticking his knife through the back of his head and out the front of his mouth. Blade then kills the Nazi that is operating the torture machine by slitting his throat and then runs full speed at Hauser. Hauser manages to grab Blade with his mechanical hand and then puts him into a scorching hot furnace. Elisa is stunned on the floor as she is experiencing Blade's pain and then Hauser wants to prove that the puppets can be destroyed, despite them being magical, by hitting Blade over and over with a sledgehammer. Elisa is also feels every strike of pain through her strong psychic connection with Blade and Hauser eventually smashes Blade's head to pieces, which causes his entire body to combust into ash. Hauser is proud to have defeated Blade but also disappointed he couldn't keep the knife as a souvenir and then Hauser accidentally breathes in the bio-energy that emits from Blade's corpse, which causes Blade to be fully reborn within Hauser's belly and he kills Hauser by chopping his way out. For a few moments Blade's facial form has changed to display his eyes in an evil frown but after putting his hat on, the face changes back to his regular face and all of Hauser's blood mysterious vanishes. This attack on Hauser was unfinished business between Blade in his human life and his former colleague. After Hauser died, his 'dead-man's switch' on his mechanical hand had been set off which meant that the Death Ray was going to shoot out its signal, so Joe hands Blade a wrench and he climbs inside of the machine and breaks the inside. This causes the ray and the hideout to explode and Blade, Elisa and Joe manage to escape unharmed. After this Elisa prints a story about a killer puppet foiling a Nazi death plot in her newspaper article and because the Daily Herlad is known for printing fictitious tabloid headlines then it isn't believed by the public. After this Joe uses Blade to climb through the vent in Madison's office and unlock the door. When Madison arrives he is ambushed by Blade and he is killed by having his throat slit and so that his corpse would look like he had committed suicide. After this Joe sets out with Blade on a mission to track down more double crossing Americans that are assisting the Nazis.

Puppet Master
In 1989, four psychics each receive unsettling visions, which they conclude have been sent by a former colleague, Neil Gallagher. The group meets at the Bodega Bay Inn where Gallagher has been staying, and before long they are introduced to Gallagher's wife, Megan. The psychics are skeptical that Gallagher had ever been wed, but this is forgotten when Megan reveals that he has recently committed suicide. Toulon's puppets, now out and about, proceed to murder everyone in the hotel until only the psychic Alex Whitaker and Megan remain. It is then that Gallagher, alive, confronts the two survivors. Gallagher explains that while he did die, he used Toulon's formula to give himself eternal life. However, when Gallagher mistreats the puppet Jester, the others revolt against him, locking him in an elevator and mercilessly killing him. Whitaker returns home. Megan, now alone, is shown picking up Dana's taxidermic dog. The dog becomes animated, indicating that she too has learned Toulon's method.

Curse of the Puppet Master
In The House of Marvels, a doll museum, with Andre Toulon's puppets in a cage, watching their current master, a man named Dr. Magrew (George Peck), stuffing something into a crate. Before leaving, he promises the puppets that things will be different next time. He drives into the woods, where he puts down the crate and douses it with gasoline, then sets it on fire. From inside the crate, faint screaming can be heard. The next morning, Dr. Magrew's daughter, Jane (Emily Harrison), has just returned home from college. She asks her father about Matt, his assistant. Her father tells her that Matt left, since his father was ill. He and Jane decide to drive into town to take their minds off things. Robert "Tank" Winsley (Josh Green), a very tall but meek young man, works at the gas station in town. He passes his time by carving small wooden statues. He is frequently harassed by bully Joey Carp (Michael D. Guerin). Jane and Dr. Magrew arrive and tell Joey to get lost. Jane finds one of the statues that Robert was carving and compliments him on it, then shows it to her father. Dr. Magrew introduces himself and Jane to Robert, and offers Robert a job helping him with the Marvel show. Robert accepts and they drive back to the house. Jane decides to go back to the woods to see what that burned box was. As she grabs what's inside of it, she sees that it's one of Matt's carved puppets, then it starts to speak: "Jane!" for help in Matt's voice. Terrified at what she saw, she then realizes that her father's going to do the same thing to Robert, so she quickly gets in her car, and drives back to the House. Meanwhile, at the house, Dr. Magrew puts Robert's soul into the puppet he especially made for Robert via electricity, and it finally works this time, but the puppets are angry because they did not want him to kill Robert, so Blade slashes Magrew's legs, hand, and face, Tunneler drills through his leg, and Pinhead hits him with a metal cane. As Jane arrives at the house, she finds her father nearly dead, bleeding to death, with him pointing at the new "tank puppet", saying "I did it". Suddenly, the Tank Puppet starts to move and points its arm at Dr. Magrew. The arm shoots out a bolt of electricity, and electrocutes Dr. Magrew straight between the eyes. The film ends with a shot of Dr. Magrew screaming before death, and Jane screaming in horrified terror.

Puppet Master II
The film begins a year later when the puppets visit the Shady Oaks cemetery, recover Toulon's corpse, and reanimate it using the last of the Egyptian's elixir. With Toulon alive, the puppets hope that he can brew a new elixir to keep them sustained. Toulon humbly pursues the formula, but to do so, his puppets are required to continue killing, as blood and brain tissue are the key ingredients. After slaying the Bodega Bay Inn's owner, Megan Gallagher, Toulon unofficially takes ownership of the hotel. A group of parapsychologists come to investigate the murder of the hotel's owner as well as the rantings of Alex Whitaker, who has gone insane since his visit to the hotel. It is during this time that Toulon designs his latest puppet, Torch. After seeing one of the investigators, Carolyn Bramwell, Toulon is reminded of his wife Elsa, who has a striking resemblance to Bramwell. Uncharacteristically, he abandons the plan to help his puppets and instead looks for a way to unite with the woman whom he believes is his reincarnated wife. Toulon plans to house his soul and Bramwell's in two life-sized mannequins. He uses a combination of the elixir and a magic spell to place his soul into one mannequin, but before Bramwell's soul can be transferred into the other mannequin, her love interest, Michael Kenney, rescues her. The puppets, both angry and ashamed that their master abandoned them, decide to kill him once again. They use the remaining elixir and mannequin to resurrect one of their victims, Michael's mother, Camille. However, Camille takes on a sadistic personality and has the puppets locked away, except for Torch, who shares her disgust for children. It is suggested that Camille uses the puppets to terrorize institutionalized children.

Puppet Master 4
After the events of II, the puppets are somehow returned to the Inn and the whereabouts of Camille are unknown. In 1993, a student scientist named Rick Myers works as caretaker at the hotel and discovers the puppets. It is now that the god Sutekh makes a second attempt to suppress the secret of animation. Sutekh has three tribal demon puppets called Totems, spiritually linked to demonic minions of his own, sent to Earth. Their goal is to hunt down key personnel in the Omega Project, an organization also attempting to create life in inanimate objects. Myers' girlfriend, Susie, pays a visit to the Bodega Bay Inn, along with her friends Cameron and Lauren. Unknown to Susie, both Myers and Cameron are previously acquainted, as they are both members of the Omega Project. Lauren, a clairvoyant, leads the group to the trunk containing Toulon's puppets and diaries. Myers learns to inject the puppets with elixir to reanimate them. The puppets befriend the group, and protect them when the Totems arrive to kill Myers and his friends. Toulon's spirit, at ease since his puppets slew him over his treachery, returns to guide the puppets. Toulon helps them to activate his unfinished puppet, Decapitron, using an electric current combined with the elixir. Decapitron becomes a vessel for Toulon's spirit. He communicates with the group using interchangeable heads and eliminates the Totems by electrocution

Puppet Master 5: The Final Chapter
Following the events of Puppet Master 4, Myers is arrested for the murders committed by the Totems. His boss, Jennings, bails Myers out because he believes he is innocent, and Myers tells Jennings about his experience with Toulon's puppets. Jennings does not believe him, but he is interested in Myers' story. Jennings organizes a group of thugs to break into the Inn and steal the puppets. Myers has a disturbing premonition and decides to return to the hotel with Blade to check on the puppets. Meanwhile, Sutekh activates another Totem, transferring his soul into it. Sutekh ambushes Jennings' thugs, then confronts Myers and Toulon's puppets. A battle between Sutekh and the puppets ensues. Sutekh attempts to retreat. However, the spirit of André Toulon, piloting Decapitron, is able to destroy him, inadvertently damaging all of the puppets in the process. After the defeat of Sutekh, Myers is cleared of the murder charges. He rebuilds the puppets and is now their guardian.

Puppet Master: The Legacy
This film attempts to fix the continuity errors within the series. It uses 30 minutes of new footage featuring two individuals discussing the history of André Toulon and his puppets, while the rest of the footage is archived from earlier films.

After the events of The Final Chapter, an elderly man named Eric Weiss finds the remaining puppets (Blade, Pinhead, Jester, Tunneler, Six Shooter) and cares for them in the basement of the Inn. Weiss is then discovered by a rogue agent, Maclain, who wants the secret element to Toulon's formula. Weiss explains that he knew Toulon before his death, but the original Puppet Master never fully shared his secrets with him. He suggests to the rogue agent that she visit Rick Myers, who possesses Toulon's diary. Maclain responds that she has already visited Myers, and killed him when he did not cooperate. Now the book is useless since it burst into flames as she read it. Weiss explains that all he has left from Toulon is his puppets, his formula, and audio recordings conducted by Toulon himself. The recordings tell of Toulon's many adventures from his time as a young man (Retro) to the death of his beloved wife during WWII (Toulon's Revenge). Weiss then reveals to Maclain that his real name is Peter Hertz, the boy who was saved by Toulon in Toulon's Revenge. Weiss states that he believes that Toulon only killed those who deserved to die, but Maclain brings up the murders of the parapsychologists from the original film and II. After a heated argument over whether Toulon was good or bad, Weiss plays another tape recording from Rick Myers, which tells about Sutek's attempt to steal the elixir formula to kill the Puppet Master (4 and The Final Chapter).

Seeing that there is one last recording, Maclain demands that Weiss play it. The recording talks about the legacy of Toulon's secret: even after his supposed death, there's always someone new who discovers it, always someone who does not fully understand what a gift, or a curse, the formula becomes for the puppets (Curse). After playing the recording, Pinhead throws a mallet at Maclain's head and Weiss shoots her in the heart with her own gun. Maclain, minutes away from death, reveals that she was hired by the puppets because all of the puppet masters that followed in Toulon's footsteps created immortals whose souls were trapped in wooden bodies, living every day in agony, wanting revenge on their Puppet Master. After Maclain's death, Weiss hears something behind him, turns around, and sees an unknown figure off-screen. He takes aim and fires. Then the screen goes to black and a note appears: “The producers would like to thank all the cast and crew that helped make the Puppet Master series a tremendous success over the years, ending the series with the puppets themselves to fight off the Puppet Masters' unholy creations”.

Puppet Master vs. Demonic Toys
The film takes place in 2004; Robert Toulon, great-nephew of original Puppet Master André Toulon, brings the puppets back to life with the help of his daughter Alex. They are soon pursued by a mysterious toymaking syndicate that seeks the Toulon's reanimation formula to turn their line of dolls into vicious killers on Christmas Eve.

Puppet Master: The Littlest Reich 
The Littlest Reich was in production at the same time as Axis Termination. The producers have said that this movie takes place in a parallel universe which explains why André Toulon is an evil Nazi this time rather than opposed to the Third Reich.

Puppet Master: Doktor Death 
A young woman named April Duval from California moved to a small mysterious town in an effort to search for a secret person. She started working as a nurse at the Shady Oaks Senior Living nursing home where she was warm welcomed by Dr. Lantmen, Carmen and their team. Her first day started bad as she witnessed resident Maximilian Cuda's corpse being carried out on a stretcher, but she kept high spirits and became a hard working and caring nurse and bonded well with all the residents. Her first duty was to clean out Max's old belongings, as he had no living relatives and it is here that she meets her fellow co-workers Ryan, Flynn and Jennifer.

Ryan and April immediately start getting very close and it looks like they are both having strong feelings to each other, which makes Flynn jealous. The two of them find an old treasure chest with a padlock on it in Max's belongings and they decide to open it up. Inside they find a mysterious antique Dr. Death skull puppet and Flynn takes it for his own as he plans to sell it at an auction. During this time April starts to read a book on haunted dolls and companionship with them, as she has a bizarre curiosity of befriending a haunted doll, but she keeps this hobby of hers secret from everyone else.

During her stay at the hotel there is several deaths, but her team assure her that the residents died of natural causes. At one point she is startled by seeing the deceased resident Dorothy Beaumont looking in through the window at her, which couldn't be possible as she was dead. This caused April to faint and have horrific dreams about the Dr. Death puppet being alive. April would notice that the puppet would be in different places all the time, but she would assume it was either Flynn fooling around or Dorothy, who was a kleptomaniac, who was just stealing it all the time.

After more extremely violent and bloody deaths start to transpire, it is clear that the residents are not dying of natural causes and there is a murder among them, so April demands Ryan to break the padlock off of Flynn's locker to see if there is any evidence to tie him to the murders, as she had a strong theory that he was the one behind it, but this is debunked when all they find is keys to his car's trunk and when opening the trunk they find Flynn in the back dying. During this time Dr. Death has embarked on a killing spree and killed every resident and staff member at the nursing home, apart from April and Ryan. Dr. Death then scalps the face off of Dr. Lantmen's corpse and turns his face into a literal skull, and then climbs inside of his internal organs and pulls on his tendons and controls his corpse like a large puppet. He has done this before with Dorothy, which is how April as able to see her in the window a few nights prior.

The night of horror comes to an end on an extreme thunderstorm, when Dr. Death in Dr. Lantmen's body attacks Flynn, but April uses a defibrillator to temporarily deactivate the monstrous body. After this Flynn is instantly killed when checking for a pulse on Dr. Lantmen's corpse and Dr. Death stabs through it with a scalpel into his forehead. Dr. Death then gets ready to finish off April as his last victim, but she demands him to stop, which shocks him as he was expecting her to be scared. April then reveals her secret that she is Duval's great-great granddaughter and she has been searching for him for years. Duval is Dr. Death's human soul and this causes him to remember who he use to be and have flashbacks of how his puppet was conceived and memories of working with Andre Toulon at the Theatre Magique in Paris and meeting the wizard Afzel. April then proceeds to tell him that she wants to help him be reunited with the other puppets, and she grins in a very sadistic way, this makes Dr. Death laugh and spare her life and seemingly agree to go on her mission of finding his old friends.

Characters

Puppets

Reception
The most well-received Puppet Master installments are generally those released before the series' four-year hiatus. As the series was revived at a time when Full Moon Features was no longer partnered with Paramount Pictures, the studio's finances grew increasingly tight, and as a result the quality of each subsequent Puppet Master title (as well as numerous other Full Moon productions) suffered. On Rotten Tomatoes, the only three installments which have been rated by critics are Puppet Master, which has a 50% rating after 8 reviews; Puppet Master II, which has a 43% rating after 7 reviews; and Puppet Master 4, which has a 0% rating after 5 reviews. The films have evidently scored much better with users, currently rating 51%, 47% and 66%, respectively.

Home media

VHS
Most Puppet Master films were originally released direct to video on VHS.

DVD
The Puppet Master films have been released on DVD in very small quantities. A box set containing the first seven installments of the series was released by Full Moon (along with a bonus disc of trailers for other Full Moon films), but was recalled shortly after. However, in 2007, Full Moon Features reacquired the rights to the first five films, and the box set has since been reissued and is available directly from Full Moon, as well as through several online retailers. The first three films were included as part of an 18-disc Full Moon Features collection, and have since been individually released as a Spanish-subtitled import collection. In 2007, Razor Digital released an uncut DualDisc version of the first film, featuring both the standard and stereoscopic versions of the film, but with very poor picture quality.
In 2012, Echo Bridge home entertainment released all 9 films in one DVD collection, while the first three films were licensed for a UK release by 88 Films.

Starting in 2010, the first Puppet Master was re-released on DVD with a new remastered widescreen transfer, while the second and third films were released with new transfers on September 18, 2012 (both individually or in a box set with the first film). The remastered editions of the fourth and fifth films were released on March 24, 2016, but only through a box set which is identical to Full Moon's original set with the bonus disc of trailers, except they also contain the remastered editions of the first 3 films (Curse of the Puppet Master and Retro Puppet Master still remain unrestored).

Blu-ray
The original Puppet Master film was released on Blu-ray in a remastered widescreen transfer on July 27, 2010. On September 18, 2012, the first three films were released on Blu-ray in a set, the second and third films also remastered in widescreen. The first 3 films have also been released on Blu-ray in the UK by 88 films.

The fourth installment was released on Blu-ray October 12, 2015, while the fifth installment was released on February 1, 2016.

In 2018, the, at the time, eleven official films in the series comprising Puppet Master through Puppet Master: Axis Termination were released as a limited edition Blu-ray set encased in a wood and metal box designed after the trunk belonging to the character of André Toulon. In addition to the films, the set contained an extra Blu-ray containing supplements related to the film series as well as a small figure of the puppet character Blade.

In early 2020, a Blu-ray box set containing the same contents as the previous set, minus the special packaging and Blade figure, was released via Full Moon's retail website.

Digital
In December 2008, Charles Band authorized the first Puppet Master film for digital download through the iTunes Store; his first foray into the digital market.

For the first time in the series, Puppet Master: Axis Termination debuted digitally on Full Moon's Amazon channel in three parts beginning on September 15, 2017.

Streaming
As a part of Full Moon Featuress Streaming App, the entire Puppet Master catalog was made available to stream as well as the Full Moon Amazon Channel.

Merchandising
 The Puppet Master Adventure - A four-issue comic book limited series written and drawn by Australian comicbook creators Dave de Vries and Glenn Lumsden and printed by Eternity Comics. It was followed by a two-issue sequel titled Children of the Puppet Master also by de Vries and Lumsden.
 The Puppet Master Action Figures - A series of action figures produced by Full Moon Toys, and scale replicas of the series' puppets, produced by Full Moon Playthings in 1998. The action figures have since been discontinued and are now collectors items.
 The Puppet Master Model Kits- A series of model kits, of various puppets from the movie were released in 1991. Not all of the puppets were released in these scale model kits. Although they were discontinued, they have recently been re-released by Full Moon Direct.
 The Puppet Master Trading Cards - a set of collectible cards of the Pupper Master characters. Also were limited edition stickers of each of the puppets face.
 The Puppet Master Costumes - A set of Clothing and Halloween costumes of the series' puppets.
 Puppet Master (Action Lab Comics) - An ongoing comic book series written by Shawn Gabborin and published by Action Lab Comics begun in 2015. The series was an instant hit among fans and is known for its attention to detail regarding the Puppet Master lore.Puppet Master: The Game''' - A multiplayer horror video game made by October Games.

Video game
An official video game adaptation created by October Games has been in development as early as 2012.

In Baby Oopsie, exclusive gameplay was shown on a television'' screen and the end credits reveal the game had been officially licensed by Full Moon and was in active development.

In September 2021, Full Moon released a trailer for the game, early access for the game released in late 2022 on Steam. the game officially released on Steam on March 1, 2023.

References

Film series introduced in 1989
Full Moon Features films
Puppet films
Horror film franchises
 
Films about sentient toys
Paramount Pictures direct-to-video films
Films scored by Richard Band
American film series
Sentient toys in fiction